Pontacq is a commune in the Pyrénées-Atlantiques department in south-western France.

Population

Notable people
 Joseph Barbanègre (1772–1830) - French General
 Matthieu Sans (1988-) - Rugby player
 Pierre Lacaze (1934-1995) - Athlete, Rugby Union & League player

See also
 Communes of the Pyrénées-Atlantiques department

References

Communes of Pyrénées-Atlantiques
Pyrénées-Atlantiques communes articles needing translation from French Wikipedia